Simon Plössl (September 19, 1794, Vienna – January 29, 1868, Vienna) was an Austrian optical instrument maker. Initially trained at the Voigtländer company, he set up his own workshop in 1823. His major achievement at the time was the improvement of the achromatic microscope objective. Today he is best known for the eponymous Plössl telescope eyepiece, which follows his 1860 design and has been used extensively by amateur astronomers since the 1980s.

External links 

 Instruments by Simon Georg Plössl 
 10 Plössl, Georg Simon
 http://www.bpccs.com/lcas/Articles/plossl.htm
 A short biography and some instruments from the Hellenic Archives of Scientific Instruments
 Early large microscope by Simon Plössl, made in 1840
 Early travel microscope by Simon Plössl, made in 1845
 Plössl Non-inclining Large Microscope, c. 1845

Optical engineers
People from Wieden
1794 births
1868 deaths
Austrian scientific instrument makers